The emmet, also called the pismire, is an heraldic charge in European heraldry, particularly in English and German heraldry, representing historic names for the ant.

Significance
The emmet might be understood as a symbol of hard work and of wisdom, although symbolism in heraldry always has to be approached with skepticism, as the arms might be canting, or the symbolism might not apply in a particular case. In his A Display of Heraldrie (1610), John Guillim of the English College of Arms says:

Attitude
The emmet is often shown as tergiant, or with his back to the viewer, as seen from above.

Examples
Massy: argent a bend azure between three emmets sable
Emmitt: sable two cross bones saltierwise between four emmets or on a chief engrailed erminois two bulls' heads azure

Gallery

Notes

Heraldic beasts
Ants
Fictional insects
Fictional ants
Insects in art
Insects in culture